Kotešová is a village and municipality in Bytča District in the Žilina Region of northern Slovakia.

History
In historical records the village was first mentioned in 1243.

Geography
The municipality lies at an altitude of 330 metres and covers an area of 20.333 km². It has a population of about 1895 people.

Genealogical resources

The records for genealogical research are available at the state archive "Statny Archiv in Bytca, Slovakia"

 Roman Catholic church records (births/marriages/deaths): 1630-1936 (parish A)
 Lutheran church records (births/marriages/deaths): 1801-1907 (parish B)

See also
 List of municipalities and towns in Slovakia

References

External links
https://web.archive.org/web/20160804130246/http://kotesova.e-obce.sk/
 Predpoveď počasia pre Kotešovú: http://www.shmu.sk/sk/?page=1&id=meteo_num_mgram
Surnames of living people in Kotesova

Villages and municipalities in Bytča District